The C programming language has a set of functions implementing operations on strings (character strings and byte strings) in its standard library. Various operations, such as copying, concatenation, tokenization and searching are supported. For character strings, the standard library uses the convention that strings are null-terminated: a string of  characters is represented as an array of  elements, the last of which is a  character (with numeric value 0).

The only support for strings in the programming language proper is that the compiler translates quoted string constants into null-terminated strings.

Definitions
A string is defined as a contiguous sequence of code units terminated by the first zero code unit (often called the NUL code unit). This means a string cannot contain the zero code unit, as the first one seen marks the end of the string. The length of a string is the number of code units before the zero code unit. The memory occupied by a string is always one more code unit than the length, as space is needed to store the zero terminator.

Generally, the term string means a string where the code unit is of type char, which is exactly 8 bits on all modern machines. C90 defines wide strings which use a code unit of type wchar_t, which is 16 or 32 bits on modern machines. This was intended for Unicode but it is increasingly common to use UTF-8 in normal strings for Unicode instead.

Strings are passed to functions by passing a pointer to the first code unit. Since char* and wchar_t* are different types, the functions that process wide strings are different than the ones processing normal strings and have different names.

String literals ("text" in the C source code) are converted to arrays during compilation. The result is an array of code units containing all the characters plus a trailing zero code unit. In C90 L"text" produces a wide string. A string literal can contain the zero code unit (one way is to put \0 into the source), but this will cause the string to end at that point. The rest of the literal will be placed in memory (with another zero code unit added to the end) but it is impossible to know those code units were translated from the string literal, therefore such source code is not a string literal.

Character encodings
Each string ends at the first occurrence of the zero code unit of the appropriate kind (char or wchar_t). Consequently, a byte string can contain non-NUL characters in ASCII or any ASCII extension, but not characters in encodings such as UTF-16 (even though a 16-bit code unit might be nonzero, its high or low byte might be zero). The encodings that can be stored in wide strings are defined by the width of wchar_t. In most implementations, wchar_t is at least 16 bits, and so all 16-bit encodings, such as UCS-2, can be stored. If wchar_t is 32-bits, then 32-bit encodings, such as UTF-32, can be stored. (The standard requires a "type that holds any wide character", which on Windows no longer holds true since the UCS-2 to UTF-16 shift. This was recognized as a defect in the standard and fixed in C++.)

Variable-width encodings can be used in both byte strings and wide strings. String length and offsets are measured in bytes or wchar_t, not in "characters", which can be confusing to beginning programmers. UTF-8 and Shift JIS are often used in C byte strings, while UTF-16 is often used in C wide strings when wchar_t is 16 bits. Truncating strings with variable-width characters using functions like strncpy can produce invalid sequences at the end of the string. This can be unsafe if the truncated parts are interpreted by code that assumes the input is valid.

Some compilers or editors will require entering all non-ASCII characters as \xNN sequences for each byte of UTF-8, and/or \uNNNN for each word of UTF-16. Since C11 (and C++11), a new  literal syntax is available that guarantees UTF-8 for a bytestring literal. Since C++20 and C23, a char8_t type was added that is meant to store UTF-8 characters and the types of u8 prefixed character and string literals were changed to char8_t and char8_t[] respectively.

Overview of functions
Most of the functions that operate on C strings are declared in the string.h header (cstring in C++), while functions that operate on C wide strings are declared in the wchar.h header (cwchar in C++). These headers also contain declarations of functions used for handling memory buffers; the name is thus something of a misnomer.

Functions declared in string.h are extremely popular since, as a part of the C standard library, they are guaranteed to work on any platform which supports C. However, some security issues exist with these functions, such as potential buffer overflows when not used carefully and properly, causing the programmers to prefer safer and possibly less portable variants, out of which some popular ones are listed below. Some of these functions also violate const-correctness by accepting a const string pointer and returning a non-const pointer within the string. To correct this, some have been separated into two overloaded functions in the C++ version of the standard library.

In historical documentation the term "character" was often used instead of "byte" for C strings, which leads many to believe that these functions somehow do not work for UTF-8. In fact all lengths are defined as being in bytes and this is true in all implementations, and these functions work as well with UTF-8 as with single-byte encodings. The BSD documentation has been fixed to make this clear, but POSIX, Linux, and Windows documentation still uses "character" in many places where "byte" or "wchar_t" is the correct term.

Functions for handling memory buffers can process sequences of bytes that include null-byte as part of the data. Names of these functions typically start with mem, as opposite to the str prefix.

Constants and types

Functions

Multibyte functions

These functions all take a pointer to a  object that the caller must maintain. This was originally intended to track shift states in the  encodings, but modern ones such as UTF-8 do not need this. However these functions were designed on the assumption that the  encoding is not a variable-width encoding and thus are designed to deal with exactly one  at a time, passing it by value rather than using a string pointer. As UTF-16 is a variable-width encoding, the  has been reused to keep track of surrogate pairs in the wide encoding, though the caller must still detect and call  twice for a single character.

Numeric conversions

The C standard library contains several functions for numeric conversions. The functions that deal with byte strings are defined in the  header ( header in C++). The functions that deal with wide strings are defined in the  header ( header in C++).

This has been fixed in C23.

Also, since the Normative Amendment 1 (C95),  functions are considered subsumed by  functions, for which reason neither C95 nor any later standard provides wide-character versions of these functions.

Popular extensions

Replacements

Despite the well-established need to replace strcat and strcpy with functions that do not allow buffer overflows, no accepted standard has arisen. This is partly due to the mistaken belief by many C programmers that strncat and strncpy have the desired behavior; however, neither function was designed for this (they were intended to manipulate null-padded fixed-size string buffers, a data format less commonly used in modern software), and the behavior and arguments are non-intuitive and often written incorrectly even by expert programmers.

The most popular replacement are the strlcat and strlcpy functions, which appeared in OpenBSD 2.4 in December, 1998. These functions always write one NUL to the destination buffer, truncating the result if necessary, and return the size of buffer that would be needed, which allows detection of the truncation and provides a size for creating a new buffer that will not truncate. They have been criticized on the basis of allegedly being inefficient, encouraging the use of C strings (instead of some superior alternative form of string), and hiding other potential errors. Consequently, they have not been included in the GNU C library (used by software on Linux), although they are implemented in the C libraries for OpenBSD, FreeBSD, NetBSD, Solaris, OS X, and QNX, as well as in alternative C libraries for Linux, such as libbsd, introduced in 2008, and musl, introduced in 2011. The lack of GNU C library support has not stopped various software authors from using it and bundling a replacement, among other SDL, GLib, ffmpeg, rsync, and even internally in the Linux kernel. Open source implementations for these functions are available.

Sometimes memcpy or memmove are used, as they may be more efficient than strcpy as they do not repeatedly check for NUL (this is less true on modern processors). Since they need a buffer length as a parameter, correct setting of this parameter can avoid buffer overflows.

As part of its 2004 Security Development Lifecycle, Microsoft introduced a family of "secure" functions including strcpy_s and strcat_s (along with many others). These functions were standardized with some minor changes as part of the optional C11 (Annex K) proposed by ISO/IEC WDTR 24731. These functions perform various checks including whether the string is too long to fit in the buffer. If the checks fail, a user-specified "runtime-constraint handler" function is called, which usually aborts the program. Some functions perform destructive operations before calling the runtime-constraint handler; for example, strcat_s sets the destination to the empty string, which can make it difficult to recover from error conditions or debug them. These functions attracted considerable criticism because initially they were implemented only on Windows and at the same time warning messages started to be produced by Microsoft Visual C++ suggesting the programmers to use these functions instead of standard ones. This has been speculated by some to be an attempt by Microsoft to lock developers into its platform. Although open-source implementations of these functions are available, these functions are not present in common Unix C libraries. Experience with these functions has shown significant problems with their adoption and errors in usage, so the removal of Annex K is proposed for the next revision of the C standard. Usage of  has also been suggested as a way to avoid unwanted compiler optimizations.

See also
  source code syntax, including backslash escape sequences
 String functions
 Perl Compatible Regular Expressions (PCRE)

Notes

References

External links

 Fast memcpy in C, multiple C coding examples to target different types of CPU instruction architectures

String handling
String handling
String (computer science)